The Night Hawk is a 1921 British silent drama film directed by John Gliddon and starring Henri de Vries, Malvina Longfellow and Sydney Seaward. It is based on the 1909 novel The Haven by Eden Phillpotts.

Cast
 Henri de Vries as John Major
 Malvina Longfellow as Lydia Major
 Sydney Seaward as Sam Brokenshire
 Nadja Ostrovska as Deborah Honeywill
 Mary Brough as Aunt Emma
 Roy Byford as Mr. Mundy
 Francis Innys as Ned Major
 Caleb Porter as William Gilberd
 Edward Sorley as Tumbledown Dick

References

Bibliography
 Low, Rachael. The History of the British Film 1918-1929. George Allen & Unwin, 1971.

External links
 

1921 films
British drama films
British silent feature films
1920s English-language films
1921 drama films
Films set in Devon
Films based on British novels
1920s British films
Silent drama films